Stanislav Medřík (born 4 April 1966) is a Slovak ice hockey player. He competed in the men's tournament at the 1994 Winter Olympics.

Career statistics

Regular season and playoffs

International

References

External links
 

1966 births
Living people
Czechoslovak ice hockey defencemen
Olympic ice hockey players of Slovakia
Ice hockey players at the 1994 Winter Olympics
Sportspeople from Nitra
HK Dukla Trenčín players
PSG Berani Zlín players
EK Zell am See players
Czechoslovak expatriate sportspeople in Austria
Czechoslovak expatriate ice hockey people
Slovak expatriate ice hockey players in Germany
Slovak ice hockey defencemen
Slovak expatriate ice hockey players in the Czech Republic